Aankh ka Nasha or Ankh ka Nasha (The Witchery of the Eyes) is an Urdu play by Agha Hashar Kashmiri. It was first published in 1924.

The play deals with themes of treachery and the evils of prostitution. It was made into a film by the same name in India in 1956, starring Anita Guha and M. Rajan in lead roles with Helen and Shammi in supporting roles. Other Indian film adaptations include a 1928 silent film by Madan Theatres and its 1933 remake in sound by J. J. Madan.

References

Plays by Agha Hashar Kashmiri
1924 plays
Plays about prostitution
Works about prostitution in India
Indian plays adapted into films
Urdu-language plays